"Vi ska till VM" is a song written by Magnus Uggla and Anders Henriksson, and was the official song for the Swedish men's national team during the 2002 FIFA World Cup in Japan and South Korea. Uggla recorded the song and released it as a single and it subsequently topped the Swedish Singles Chart. It was also tested for Svensktoppen on 1 June 2002, but failed to enter chart.

Charts

Weekly charts

Year-end charts

References

2002 FIFA World Cup
2002 singles
2002 songs
Magnus Uggla songs
Number-one singles in Sweden
Sweden national football team songs
Swedish-language songs
Songs written by Anders Henriksson (record producer)